Unión Deportiva Las Zocas is a Spanish football team based in Las Zocas, San Miguel de Abona, in the autonomous community of the Canary Islands. Founded in 1986, it plays in Tercera División RFEF – Group 12, holding home games at Estadio Juanito Marrero, with a capacity of 3,000 seats.

History 
Las Zocas was founded in 1986, and its first president was Felix Toledo Rancel. In the 2000-01 season the club finished 14th among 20 teams in the group 12 of Tercera División. The following season Las Zocas improved its position by finishing in the first half of the standings, in the 8th position.

Season to season

18 seasons in Tercera División
1 season in Tercera División RFEF

Famous players
 Cristo

References

External links
Official website 
Futbolme team profile 

Football clubs in the Canary Islands
Sport in Tenerife
Association football clubs established in 1986
1986 establishments in Spain